The 1997 Trans America Athletic Conference men's basketball tournament (now known as the ASUN men's basketball tournament) was held February 27–March 1 at F. Mitchell Johnson Arena at the College of Charleston in Charleston, South Carolina.

College of Charleston defeated  in the championship game, 83–73, to win their first TAAC/Atlantic Sun men's basketball tournament.

The Cougars, therefore, received the TAAC's automatic bid to the 1997 NCAA tournament, their first automatic bid to the Division I tournament. Charleston defeated Maryland in the First Round before falling to eventual-champion Arizona in the Round of 32.

Format
The 12 teams in the TAAC were separated into two six-team divisions, and the top four eligible teams from each division qualified for the tournament. College of Charleston became eligible for the tournament this year after becoming a full Division I member. However, transitioning members Florida Atlantic and Jacksonville State were not eligible.

Bracket

References

ASUN men's basketball tournament
Tournament
TAAC men's basketball tournament
TAAC men's basketball tournament
TAAC men's basketball tournament